Spitfire is a ska band formed in Saint Petersburg, Russia in 1993.

Biography 
Spitfire started in the beginning of 1993, then as a garage rockabilly trio, whose music also included some elements of noise. Their first live gig took place during the St. Petersburg Psycho Festival in February 1993. The summer 1993 brought new ideas and Spitfire began to do more noise/garage, they decided to give up their double bass for an electric bass guitar. While searching for a new sound, they did a program based on covers of 1960's garage music. 

At the end of 1993, their music had turned into garage punk and finally into ska-core. Actually, ska had been one of their favourite styles and a big passion for a long time before they decided to play it themselves. A saxophonist and a trumpet player joined the band in the fall 1993, and Spitfire transformed from an aggressive punk gang into jolly and humorous mini-orchestra playing punk-ska. The spring 1994 brought both their first recording session and a new bassist. Since mastering that first demo, Spitfire has had a number of very successful concerts at various clubs. All these gigs were full of energy and enthusiasm. 

In the spring 1995 they released a song on the compilation called United Colours of Ska, Volume II, on German Pork Pie label. A year later they recorded an album at St.Petersburg "Melodia" studio, which was then mixed in Berlin at Pork Pie. This album, called Night Hunting, was released in the end of 1996. Spitfire has been touring regularly since that time. 

In January 1999 Spitfire had made another recording session at Vielklang studio in Berlin, and the result came out in the spring with new album The Coast Is Clear. 

In the spring 2001 a keyboard player joined the band making its sound even more powerful. At the same time Spitfire started a spinoff project St. Petersburg Ska-Jazz Review in collaboration with the members of St.Petersburg-based afro-caribbean-oriented band Markscheider Kunst. The initial idea was to make a single-show program comprising mostly jazz standards such as "Sidewinder", "Corcovado", "Four" and original ska tunes ("St. Thomas", "Man in the street") to perform at Sergey Kuryokhin International Festival (SKIF) in April 2001. 

The line-up of this band included the bariton-sax and percussion players as well as all members of Spitfire. The show gained much interest and the band went on playing live gigs on Russian club scene. The debut album was recorded in March 2002 at Dobrolet studio in St. Petersburg and put out in Russia in the fall 2002 on small independent label Zvezda Records. 

In November 2001 Spitfire musicians were invited to participate in the recording session of the band Leningrad. This band was one of the top acts on Russian music scene. The style of Leningrad music is hard to describe, since the regular play-list of their live show includes numbers stylistically varying from ska and reggae to punk and funky hip-hop. The Leningrad album "21st Century Pirates" was released in February 2002 and the whole Spitfire line-up was invited to perform at Leningrad album release show at Yubileyny Sports Palace in St. Petersburg. From that show on Spitfire musicians work together with Leningrad on albums - For millions (2003), Second Magadan (2003), Babarobot (2004), Huinya (2005; together with cabaret Tiger Lillies), Awrora (2007) - and played many gigs in Russia and Europe. In the end of 2008 the singer Shnur decided to split Leningrad up. 

In November-December 2002 Spitfire, St. Petersburg Ska-Jazz Review and Leningrad toured the United States. 15 gigs were performed all over the Atlantic coast from Boston to Miami. All events were of much interest for American audience. The second American tour of Leningrad and Spitfire happened in the summer 2003. The bands performed live in such venues as Irving Plaza and CBGB (New York City), Middle East (Boston), The Knitting Factory (Los Angeles). 

In January 2004 the third Spitfire album Thrills And Kills came out both in Europe on German Vielklang label and in Russia on recently opened independent Shnur'OK label. As the previous one "The Coast Is Clear", "Thrills And Kills" was also recorded and mastered at Vielklang studio in Berlin. This album was more diverse musically and included more tracks which style could be rather referred to as guitar rock with the horn section. The album release was supported by a 5-weeks-long tour: 27 gigs in Germany, Switzerland and Italy. 

In the spring 2004 some members of Spitfire were invited to take part in the project called The Optymistica Orchestra. This initial aim of this project was to compose a live soundtrack for the short-cut movies compilation "10 minutes older: the violin". As it usually happens, the band went on playing live and even recorded the debut album at St. Petersburg Dobrolet studio. The album is supposed to be released in the spring 2005.

In 2008 Spitfire released their fourth album "Lifetime Visa", which is a straight rock album with horn section.

In 2012, they released their fifth album, "5".

External links 
 http://www.spitfire.spb.ru/

Russian rock music groups
Musical groups from Moscow
1993 establishments in Russia
Musical groups established in 1993
Ska punk musical groups